Raycroft is an English surname. Notable people include:
Andrew Raycroft (born 1980), Canadian former professional ice hockey player
Joseph Raycroft (1867–1955), American basketball coach
Jordan Raycroft (born 1991), Canadian singer and member of the band Raycroft

See also
Jordan Raycroft (album)
Raycroft Lookout, a stone platform in Monroe State Forest, Massachusetts, United States

Surnames of English origin
English-language surnames